The Academy of Military Engineering of Guadalajara was a military academy in Guadalajara, Spain. It operated in Guadalajara from 1833 until its move to Segovia in 1932 as part of its merger with the Artillery Academy (Academia de Artilleros).

The Academy was located in the Montesclaros Palace, in the west of the city, until a 1924 fire destroyed part of the premises and an important collection of models, documents, books, and artworks.  Between 1924 and its final move, its activities were continued in the palace's annex buildings that today serve as the General Military Archive of Guadalajara (Archivo General Militar de Guadalajara) and the palace of Antonio de Mendoza.

Many important figures attended or taught at the Academy, including Mariano Barberán, Eduardo Barrón, Alejandro Goicoechea, Emilio Herrera Linares, Alfredo Kindelán, José Ortiz Echagüe, Carlos Faraudo and Pedro Vives Vich.

References 

Province of Guadalajara
Military academies of Spain
Educational institutions established in 1833
1833 establishments in Spain
1932 disestablishments in Spain
Defunct military academies
Military engineering